Carmen González is an Ecuadorian singer and songwriter. She is the lead singer for Koral y Esmeralda. The album Caramba was a tribute to Ecuador's Afro-Ecuadorian musical heritage.

See also 
Afro-Ecuadorian music

References

Living people
Year of birth missing (living people)
Place of birth missing (living people)
20th-century Ecuadorian women singers
21st-century Ecuadorian women singers